Molla Mahalleh-ye Chehel Setun (also Romanized as Mollā Maḩalleh-ye Chehel Setūn; also known as Chehel Setūn) is a village in Ahandan Rural District, in the Central District of Lahijan County, Gilan Province, Iran. At the 2006 census, its population was 84, in 23 families.

References 

Populated places in Lahijan County